Passalurus is a genus of nematodes belonging to the family Oxyuridae.

The species of this genus are found in Europe and Northern America.

Species:

Passalurus ambiguus 
Passalurus nonannulatus

References

Nematodes